Wertmüller is a German surname. Notable people with the surname include:

Adolf Ulrik Wertmüller (1751—1811), Swedish painter 
Lina Wertmüller (1928–2021), Italian screenwriter and film director
Massimo Wertmüller (born 1956), Italian actor, nephew of Lina

German-language surnames